The 1985 season was the Philadelphia Phillies 103rd season. The Phillies finished in fifth place in the National League East with a record of 75 wins and 87 losses. It was the first time the team finished below .500 since going 80–82 in 1974.

Offseason
 November 9, 1984: Steve Fireovid was released by the Phillies.
 February 4, 1985: Al Oliver was traded by the Phillies to the Los Angeles Dodgers for Pat Zachry.

Regular season

Season standings

Record vs. opponents

Notable transactions
 April 3, 1985: Kiko Garcia was released by the Phillies.
 April 5, 1985: Kiko Garcia was signed as a free agent by the Phillies.
 April 20, 1985: Al Holland and Frankie Griffin (minors) were traded by the Phillies to the Pittsburgh Pirates for Kent Tekulve.
 May 17, 1985: Kiko Garcia was released by the Phillies.
 June 3, 1985: 1985 Major League Baseball Draft
The Phillies drafted catcher Trey McCall with the 16th overall pick in the 1985 Draft.
Bruce Ruffin was drafted by the Phillies in the 2nd round. Player signed June 12, 1985.
Wally Ritchie was drafted by the Phillies in the 4th round.
 August 8, 1985: Bo Díaz and Greg Simpson (minors) were traded by the Phillies to the Cincinnati Reds for Alan Knicely, Tom Foley and a player to be named later. The Reds completed the deal by sending Freddie Toliver to the Phillies on August 27.
 August 24, 1985: Scott Service was signed by the Philadelphia Phillies as an amateur free agent.
 September 13, 1985: Rick Surhoff was traded by the Phillies to the Texas Rangers for Dave Stewart.

Game log

|- style="background:#fbb"
| 1 || April 9 || Braves || 0–6 || Rick Mahler (1–0) || Steve Carlton (0–1) || None || 35,361 || 0–1
|- style="background:#fbb"
| 2 || April 11 || Braves || 3–6 || Zane Smith (1–0) || John Denny (0–1) || Bruce Sutter (1) || 17,987 || 0–2
|- style="background:#fbb"
| 3 || April 12 || @ Astros || 3–8 || Dave Smith (1–0) || Larry Andersen (0–1) || Jeff Calhoun (1) || 11,879 || 0–3
|- style="background:#bfb"
| 4 || April 13 || @ Astros || 4–2 || Shane Rawley (1–0) || Ron Mathis (0–1) || Al Holland (1) || 19,772 || 1–3
|- style="background:#fbb"
| 5 || April 14 || @ Astros || 3–5 || Nolan Ryan (2–0) || Steve Carlton (0–2) || None || 15,277 || 1–4
|- style="background:#fbb"
| 6 || April 15 || @ Cubs || 1–2 || Steve Trout (2–0) || Kevin Gross (0–1) || Lee Smith (2) || 8,347 || 1–5
|- style="background:#fbb"
| 7 || April 16 || @ Cubs || 0–1 (10) || Dennis Eckersley (1–1) || Al Holland (0–1) || None || 11,937 || 1–6
|- style="background:#fbb"
| 8 || April 17 || @ Cubs || 4–5 || George Frazier (1–0) || Kevin Gross (0–2) || Lee Smith (3) || 15,752 || 1–7
|- style="background:#fbb"
| 9 || April 19 || Mets || 0–1 || Dwight Gooden (2–0) || Charles Hudson (0–1) || Jesse Orosco (1) || 32,420 || 1–8
|- style="background:#bfb"
| 10 || April 20 || Mets || 7–6 || John Denny (1–1) || Ed Lynch (0–1) || Larry Andersen (1) || 24,013 || 2–8
|- style="background:#bfb"
| 11 || April 21 || Mets || 10–6 || Kevin Gross (1–2) || Doug Sisk (1–1) || None || 30,186 || 3–8
|- style="background:#bfb"
| 12 || April 22 || @ Expos || 9–1 || Shane Rawley (2–0) || Joe Hesketh (1–1) || None || 6,249 || 4–8
|- style="background:#fbb"
| 13 || April 23 || @ Expos || 4–5 (10) || Jeff Reardon (1–0) || Charles Hudson (0–2) || None || 8,223 || 4–9
|- style="background:#fbb"
| 14 || April 24 || @ Expos || 6–7 || Bryn Smith (3–0) || John Denny (1–2) || Tim Burke (1) || 10,417 || 4–10
|- style="background:#fbb"
| 15 || April 26 || Cubs || 3–7 || Dennis Eckersley (3–1) || Jerry Koosman (0–1) || None || 27,187 || 4–11
|- style="background:#bfb"
| 16 || April 27 || Cubs || 6–1 || Shane Rawley (3–0) || Scott Sanderson (1–1) || None || 25,220 || 5–11
|- style="background:#bfb"
| 17 || April 28 || Cubs || 3–2 || Kevin Gross (2–2) || Rick Sutcliffe (3–2) || Larry Andersen (2) || 31,890 || 6–11
|- style="background:#bfb"
| 18 || April 29 || Expos || 3–2 (10) || Kent Tekulve (1–0) || Bert Roberge (0–1) || None || 19,124 || 7–11
|- style="background:#bfb"
| 19 || April 30 || Expos || 11–0 || Jerry Koosman (1–1) || Bill Gullickson (3–2) || None || 18,104 || 8–11
|-

|- style="background:#fbb"
| 20 || May 1 || Expos || 2–3 || David Palmer (2–2) || Shane Rawley (3–1) || Jeff Reardon (6) || 17,464 || 8–12
|- style="background:#bfb"
| 21 || May 3 || Astros || 3–2 || Kent Tekulve (2–0) || Frank DiPino (1–3) || None || 17,330 || 9–12
|- style="background:#bfb"
| 22 || May 4 || Astros || 7–5 (13) || Dave Rucker (1–0) || Bill Dawley (0–2) || None || 25,521 || 10–12
|- style="background:#fbb"
| 23 || May 5 || Astros || 3–4 || Joe Niekro (2–3) || Shane Rawley (3–2) || Frank DiPino (4) || 27,506 || 10–13
|- style="background:#fbb"
| 24 || May 7 || Reds || 0–2 || Mario Soto (5–2) || Kevin Gross (2–3) || Ted Power (4) || 21,902 || 10–14
|- style="background:#fbb"
| 25 || May 8 || Reds || 2–8 || Jay Tibbs (2–4) || John Denny (1–3) || None || 22,416 || 10–15
|- style="background:#fbb"
| 26 || May 10 || @ Mets || 0–5 || Dwight Gooden (5–1) || Steve Carlton (0–3) || None || 46,143 || 10–16
|- style="background:#fbb"
| 27 || May 11 || @ Mets || 0–4 || Sid Fernandez (1–0) || Shane Rawley (3–3) || Roger McDowell (1) || 29,635 || 10–17
|- style="background:#fbb"
| 28 || May 12 || @ Mets || 2–3 || Ron Darling (3–1) || Kevin Gross (2–4) || Jesse Orosco (4) || 32,597 || 10–18
|- style="background:#fbb"
| 29 || May 13 || @ Reds || 3–7 || John Stuper (4–2) || John Denny (1–4) || None || 12,068 || 10–19
|- style="background:#bfb"
| 30 || May 14 || @ Reds || 7–1 || Charles Hudson (1–2) || Tom Browning (3–2) || None || 10,079 || 11–19
|- style="background:#fbb"
| 31 || May 15 || @ Braves || 2–3 (10) || Bruce Sutter (2–0) || Kent Tekulve (2–1) || None || 10,292 || 11–20
|- style="background:#fbb"
| 32 || May 16 || @ Braves || 3–6 || Jeff Dedmon (1–0) || Larry Andersen (0–2) || Bruce Sutter (6) || 10,116 || 11–21
|- style="background:#bfb"
| 33 || May 17 || Dodgers || 10–5 || Kevin Gross (3–4) || Jerry Reuss (2–4) || None || 16,334 || 12–21
|- style="background:#bfb"
| 34 || May 18 || Dodgers || 7–5 || Larry Andersen (1–2) || Tom Niedenfuer (1–2) || Don Carman (1) || 24,189 || 13–21
|- style="background:#fbb"
| 35 || May 19 || Dodgers || 2–3 || Fernando Valenzuela (4–4) || Charles Hudson (1–3) || Ken Howell (5) || 35,276 || 13–22
|- style="background:#bfb"
| 36 || May 20 || Giants || 2–1 || Steve Carlton (1–3) || Vida Blue (2–1) || Kent Tekulve (1) || 20,634 || 14–22
|- style="background:#bfb"
| 37 || May 21 || Giants || 6–5 || Shane Rawley (4–3) || Atlee Hammaker (0–4) || Kent Tekulve (2) || 18,583 || 15–22
|- style="background:#fbb"
| 38 || May 22 || Giants || 2–6 || Dave LaPoint (2–5) || Kevin Gross (3–5) || Scott Garrelts (4) || 18,804 || 15–23
|- style="background:#fbb"
| 39 || May 24 || Padres || 0–1 || Dave Dravecky (4–2) || John Denny (1–5) || Rich Gossage (12) || 20,262 || 15–24
|- style="background:#fbb"
| 40 || May 25 || Padres || 1–4 || Andy Hawkins (9–0) || Charles Hudson (1–4) || None || 20,539 || 15–25
|- style="background:#fbb"
| 41 || May 26 || Padres || 2–7 || LaMarr Hoyt (4–4) || Steve Carlton (1–4) || Rich Gossage (13) || 40,182 || 15–26
|- style="background:#bfb"
| 42 || May 27 || Padres || 10–9 || Kent Tekulve (3–1) || Craig Lefferts (1–1) || None || 27,283 || 16–26
|- style="background:#fbb"
| 43 || May 29 || @ Dodgers || 1–6 || Orel Hershiser (5–0) || Kevin Gross (3–6) || None || 36,422 || 16–27
|- style="background:#bfb"
| 44 || May 30 || @ Dodgers || 6–1 || John Denny (2–5) || Fernando Valenzuela (5–5) || None || 29,591 || 17–27
|- style="background:#fbb"
| 45 || May 31 || @ Giants || 3–4 || Mike Krukow (4–3) || Charles Hudson (1–5) || Mark Davis (1) || 7,755 || 17–28
|-

|- style="background:#fbb"
| 46 || June 1 || @ Giants || 1–2 || Atlee Hammaker (2–4) || Steve Carlton (1–5) || Greg Minton (1) || 21,313 || 17–29
|- style="background:#fbb"
| 47 || June 2 || @ Giants || 1–3 || Vida Blue (3–1) || Shane Rawley (4–4) || Mark Davis (2) || 13,799 || 17–30
|- style="background:#bfb"
| 48 || June 3 || @ Padres || 3–2 || Kevin Gross (4–6) || Dave Dravecky (4–3) || Kent Tekulve (3) || 17,740 || 18–30
|- style="background:#fbb"
| 49 || June 4 || @ Padres || 5–6 || Craig Lefferts (2–2) || Kent Tekulve (3–2) || None || 25,141 || 18–31
|- style="background:#fbb"
| 50 || June 5 || @ Padres || 1–3 || LaMarr Hoyt (6–4) || Charles Hudson (1–6) || None || 30,352 || 18–32
|- style="background:#fbb"
| 51 || June 7 || Expos || 1–3 || David Palmer (4–5) || Steve Carlton (1–6) || Jeff Reardon (16) || 21,039 || 18–33
|- style="background:#fbb"
| 52 || June 8 || Expos || 3–4 || Bryn Smith (6–2) || Shane Rawley (4–5) || Jeff Reardon (17) || 22,486 || 18–34
|- style="background:#bfb"
| 53 || June 9 || Expos || 4–1 || Kevin Gross (5–6) || Joe Hesketh (5–3) || Kent Tekulve (4) || 22,628 || 19–34
|- style="background:#bfb"
| 54 || June 10 || Mets || 6–4 || John Denny (3–5) || Sid Fernandez (1–3) || None || 22,183 || 20–34
|- style="background:#bfb"
| 55 || June 11 || Mets || 26–7 || Charles Hudson (2–6) || Tom Gorman (3–3) || None || 22,591 || 21–34
|- style="background:#fbb"
| 56 || June 12 || Mets || 3–7 (11) || Rick Aguilera (1–0) || Dave Rucker (1–1) || None || 22,455 || 21–35
|- style="background:#bfb"
| 57 || June 13 || Mets || 5–4 || Shane Rawley (5–5) || Jesse Orosco (1–3) || None || 23,381 || 22–35
|- style="background:#fbb"
| 58 || June 14 || @ Pirates || 2–3 || José DeLeón (2–8) || Don Carman (0–1) || Don Robinson (1) || 10,211 || 22–36
|- style="background:#bfb"
| 59 || June 15 || @ Pirates || 13–3 || John Denny (4–5) || Rick Rhoden (4–7) || None || 10,897 || 23–36
|- style="background:#bfb"
| 60 || June 16 || @ Pirates || 3–2 || Charles Hudson (3–6) || Rick Reuschel (3–1) || Kent Tekulve (5) || 14,451 || 24–36
|- style="background:#fbb"
| 61 || June 18 || @ Cardinals || 2–6 || John Tudor (5–7) || Steve Carlton (1–7) || None || 34,089 || 24–37
|- style="background:#bfb"
| 62 || June 19 || @ Cardinals || 1–0 || Jerry Koosman (2–1) || Joaquín Andújar (12–2) || Don Carman (2) || 32,146 || 25–37
|- style="background:#fbb"
| 63 || June 20 || @ Cardinals || 0–5 || Danny Cox (9–2) || Kevin Gross (5–7) || None || 32,397 || 25–38
|- style="background:#bfb"
| 64 || June 21 || Pirates || 4–3 (16) || Larry Andersen (2–2) || Jim Winn (2–2) || None || 22,493 || 26–38
|- style="background:#bfb"
| 65 || June 22 || Pirates || 5–2 || Don Carman (1–1) || Don Robinson (2–2) || None || 23,623 || 27–38
|- style="background:#bfb"
| 66 || June 23 || Pirates || 3–2 || Don Carman (2–1) || Jim Winn (2–3) || None || 29,082 || 28–38
|- style="background:#bbb"
| – || June 24 || Cardinals || colspan=6 | Postponed (rain); Makeup: August 10 as a traditional double-header
|- style="background:#bfb"
| 67 || June 25 || Cardinals || 3–1 || Jerry Koosman (3–1) || Joaquín Andújar (12–3) || None || 24,432 || 29–38
|- style="background:#bfb"
| 68 || June 25 || Cardinals || 6–4 || John Denny (5–5) || Danny Cox (9–3) || Kent Tekulve (6) || 22,213 || 30–38
|- style="background:#fbb"
| 69 || June 27 || Cardinals || 3–4 || Kurt Kepshire (5–5) || Shane Rawley (5–6) || Jeff Lahti (6) || 22,691 || 30–39
|- style="background:#fbb"
| 70 || June 28 || @ Expos || 3–5 || Bryn Smith (9–3) || Charles Hudson (3–7) || Tim Burke (2) || 15,031 || 30–40
|- style="background:#bfb"
| 71 || June 29 || @ Expos || 6–2 || Kevin Gross (6–7) || Mickey Mahler (1–2) || None || 22,813 || 31–40
|- style="background:#bfb"
| 72 || June 30 || @ Expos || 3–2 || Kent Tekulve (4–2) || Jeff Reardon (2–3) || None || 35,085 || 32–40
|-

|- style="background:#fbb"
| 73 || July 1 || Cubs || 1–3 || Ray Fontenot (3–3) || John Denny (5–6) || Lee Smith (17) || 23,091 || 32–41
|- style="background:#bfb"
| 74 || July 2 || Cubs || 11–2 || Shane Rawley (6–6) || Rick Sutcliffe (7–7) || None || 23,005 || 33–41
|- style="background:#fbb"
| 75 || July 3 || Cubs || 3–4 || Lee Smith (4–2) || Kent Tekulve (4–3) || None || 56,092 || 33–42
|- style="background:#bfb"
| 76 || July 4 || Reds || 3–1 || Kevin Gross (7–7) || Mario Soto (8–8) || None || 21,291 || 34–42
|- style="background:#bfb"
| 77 || July 5 || Reds || 5–2 || Larry Andersen (3–2) || Tom Browning (7–6) || Don Carman (3) || 25,001 || 35–42
|- style="background:#fbb"
| 78 || July 6 || Reds || 2–4 || Ron Robinson (4–0) || John Denny (5–7) || Ted Power (14) || 25,161 || 35–43
|- style="background:#fbb"
| 79 || July 7 || Reds || 2–3 (10) || John Franco (5–1) || Kent Tekulve (4–4) || Ted Power (15) || 32,014 || 35–44
|- style="background:#bfb"
| 80 || July 8 || @ Astros || 7–4 || Charles Hudson (4–7) || Mark Knudson (0–1) || Kent Tekulve (7) || 8,484 || 36–44
|- style="background:#bfb"
| 81 || July 9 || @ Astros || 5–3 || Kevin Gross (8–7) || Bob Knepper (8–5) || Kent Tekulve (8) || 9,606 || 37–44
|- style="background:#fbb"
| 82 || July 10 || @ Astros || 0–10 || Mike Scott (8–4) || Jerry Koosman (3–2) || None || 9,222 || 37–45
|- style="background:#fbb"
| 83 || July 11 || @ Braves || 2–3 || Bruce Sutter (5–4) || Larry Andersen (3–3) || None || 10,316 || 37–46
|- style="background:#fbb"
| 84 || July 12 || @ Braves || 4–7 || Terry Forster (1–2) || Don Carman (2–2) || None || 23,345 || 37–47
|- style="background:#fbb"
| 85 || July 13 || @ Braves || 5–13 || Rick Mahler (13–7) || Charles Hudson (4–8) || None || 31,257 || 37–48
|- style="background:#fbb"
| 86 || July 14 || @ Braves || 3–12 || Pascual Pérez (1–7) || Kevin Gross (8–8) || Rick Camp (1) || 17,313 || 37–49
|- style="background:#bbcaff;"
| – || July 16 ||colspan="7" |1985 Major League Baseball All-Star Game at the Hubert H. Humphrey Metrodome in Minneapolis
|- style="background:#bfb"
| 87 || July 18 || @ Reds || 6–3 || Jerry Koosman (4–2) || Mario Soto (8–11) || Kent Tekulve (9) || 25,447 || 38–49
|- style="background:#fbb"
| 88 || July 19 || @ Reds || 2–3 || John Franco (7–1) || Kent Tekulve (4–5) || None || 28,929 || 38–50
|- style="background:#bfb"
| 89 || July 20 || @ Reds || 10–6 || Shane Rawley (7–6) || Ron Robinson (5–1) || Kent Tekulve (10) || 33,624 || 39–50
|- style="background:#fbb"
| 90 || July 21 || @ Reds || 6–7 || John Franco (8–1) || Don Carman (2–3) || Ted Power (17) || 30,327 || 39–51
|- style="background:#bfb"
| 91 || July 22 || Astros || 7–6 || Don Carman (3–3) || Jeff Heathcock (0–1) || None || 20,450 || 40–51
|- style="background:#bfb"
| 92 || July 23 || Astros || 12–6 || Jerry Koosman (5–2) || Bob Knepper (8–8) || None || 21,074 || 41–51
|- style="background:#bfb"
| 93 || July 24 || Astros || 3–1 || Kevin Gross (9–8) || Nolan Ryan (8–8) || Kent Tekulve (11) || 23,160 || 42–51
|- style="background:#fbb"
| 94 || July 25 || Braves || 2–3 || Bruce Sutter (6–4) || Kent Tekulve (4–6) || None || 18,318 || 42–52
|- style="background:#fbb"
| 95 || July 26 || Braves || 4–6 || Rick Mahler (15–8) || John Denny (5–8) || Bruce Sutter (17) || 22,212 || 42–53
|- style="background:#bfb"
| 96 || July 27 || Braves || 5–4 || Charles Hudson (5–8) || Zane Smith (6–7) || None || 23,027 || 43–53
|- style="background:#bfb"
| 97 || July 28 || Braves || 7–3 || Jerry Koosman (6–2) || Steve Bedrosian (5–10) || None || 30,160 || 44–53
|- style="background:#bfb"
| 98 || July 30 || @ Pirates || 2–0 || Kevin Gross (10–8) || Rick Rhoden (5–12) || Kent Tekulve (12) || 7,496 || 45–53
|- style="background:#fbb"
| 99 || July 31 || @ Pirates || 3–4 (10) || Cecilio Guante (3–3) || Kent Tekulve (4–7) || None || 6,797 || 45–54
|-

|- style="background:#bfb"
| 100 || August 1 || @ Pirates || 3–0 || John Denny (6–8) || Don Robinson (2–6) || None || 6,199 || 46–54
|- style="background:#fbb"
| 101 || August 2 || @ Cardinals || 2–3 || John Tudor (13–8) || Charles Hudson (5–9) || None || 47,805 || 46–55
|- style="background:#bfb"
| 102 || August 3 || @ Cardinals || 6–4 (10) || Don Carman (4–3) || Jeff Lahti (1–1) || Larry Andersen (3) || 47,051 || 47–55
|- style="background:#bfb"
| 103 || August 4 || @ Cardinals || 6–0 || Kevin Gross (11–8) || Joaquín Andújar (17–6) || None || 46,674 || 48–55
|- style="background:#bfb"
| 104 || August 5 || @ Cardinals || 9–1 || Shane Rawley (8–6) || Danny Cox (12–7) || None || 36,689 || 49–55
|- style="background:#bbb"
| – || August 6 || Pirates || colspan=6 | Postponed (rain); Makeup: October 5 as a traditional double-header
|- style="background:#bbb"
| – || August 7 || Pirates || colspan=6 | Postponed (rain); Makeup: October 4 as a traditional double-header
|- style="background:#bfb"
| 105 || August 8 || Pirates || 7–3 || John Denny (7–8) || Don Robinson (2–7) || Don Carman (4) || 18,142 || 50–55
|- style="background:#fbb"
| 106 || August 9 || Cardinals || 4–5 || Joaquín Andújar (18–6) || Charles Hudson (5–10) || Jeff Lahti (13) || 25,194 || 50–56
|- style="background:#fbb"
| 107 || August 10 (1) || Cardinals || 4–5 || Danny Cox (13–7) || Jerry Koosman (6–3) || Jeff Lahti (14) || see 2nd game || 50–57
|- style="background:#fbb"
| 108 || August 10 (2) || Cardinals || 4–13 || Ricky Horton (1–2) || Kevin Gross (11–9) || None || 37,321 || 50–58
|- style="background:#bfb"
| 109 || August 11 || Cardinals || 4–1 || Shane Rawley (9–6) || Bob Forsch (4–5) || None || 31,602 || 51–58
|- style="background:#fbb"
| 110 || August 12 || @ Mets || 3–4 || Sid Fernandez (4–6) || John Denny (7–9) || Jesse Orosco (12) || 26,577 || 51–59
|- style="background:#fbb"
| 111 || August 13 || @ Mets || 2–4 || Rick Aguilera (6–3) || Charles Hudson (5–11) || Jesse Orosco (13) || 31,186 || 51–60
|- style="background:#bfb"
| 112 || August 14 || @ Mets || 2–1 || Kevin Gross (12–9) || Ron Darling (10–5) || Don Carman (5) || 31,549 || 52–60
|- style="background:#fbb"
| 113 || August 15 || @ Mets || 7–10 || Jesse Orosco (4–4) || Don Carman (4–4) || None || 36,663 || 52–61
|- style="background:#fbb"
| 114 || August 16 || @ Cubs || 5–6 || Lee Smith (6–4) || Kent Tekulve (4–8) || None || 31,557 || 52–62
|- style="background:#bfb"
| 115 || August 17 || @ Cubs || 10–4 || John Denny (8–9) || Lary Sorensen (3–4) || None || 31,421 || 53–62
|- style="background:#bfb"
| 116 || August 18 || @ Cubs || 9–5 || Charles Hudson (6–11) || Jay Baller (0–1) || Kent Tekulve (13) || 31,269 || 54–62
|- style="background:#fbb"
| 117 || August 20 || Dodgers || 4–5 (11) || Tom Niedenfuer (6–4) || Kent Tekulve (4–9) || Rick Honeycutt (1) || 24,227 || 54–63
|- style="background:#fbb"
| 118 || August 21 || Dodgers || 6–15 || Fernando Valenzuela (15–8) || Jerry Koosman (6–4) || None || 23,650 || 54–64
|- style="background:#bfb"
| 119 || August 22 || Dodgers || 2–0 || Shane Rawley (10–6) || Jerry Reuss (11–8) || None || 22,598 || 55–64
|- style="background:#fbb"
| 120 || August 23 || Giants || 1–4 || Atlee Hammaker (4–10) || John Denny (8–10) || Scott Garrelts (11) || 26,194 || 55–65
|- style="background:#bfb"
| 121 || August 24 || Giants || 9–2 || Charles Hudson (7–11) || Mike Krukow (8–9) || None || 27,011 || 56–65
|- style="background:#bfb"
| 122 || August 25 || Giants || 14–5 || Dave Rucker (2–1) || Jim Gott (4–10) || None || 25,653 || 57–65
|- style="background:#bfb"
| 123 || August 26 || Padres || 4–3 || Don Carman (5–4) || Lance McCullers (0–1) || None || 25,736 || 58–65
|- style="background:#fbb"
| 124 || August 27 || Padres || 1–4 || Mark Thurmond (6–7) || John Denny (8–11) || Roy Lee Jackson (2) || 23,604 || 58–66
|- style="background:#bfb"
| 125 || August 29 || @ Dodgers || 3–2 (10) || Don Carman (6–4) || Rick Honeycutt (7–12) || None || 39,487 || 59–66
|- style="background:#bfb"
| 126 || August 30 || @ Dodgers || 5–2 || Kevin Gross (13–9) || Bob Welch (9–3) || Dave Shipanoff (1) || 49,068 || 60–66
|- style="background:#bfb"
| 127 || August 31 || @ Dodgers || 5–0 || Shane Rawley (11–6) || Fernando Valenzuela (16–9) || None || 46,942 || 61–66
|-

|- style="background:#bfb"
| 128 || September 1 || @ Dodgers || 4–1 || John Denny (9–11) || Jerry Reuss (12–9) || Dave Shipanoff (2) || 29,029 || 62–66
|- style="background:#bfb"
| 129 || September 2 || @ Giants || 4–3 (10) || Don Carman (7–4) || Mike Jeffcoat (0–2) || Dave Shipanoff (3) || 6,522 || 63–66
|- style="background:#bfb"
| 130 || September 3 || @ Giants || 4–3 (13) || Dave Shipanoff (1–0) || Greg Minton (3–4) || Freddie Toliver (1) || 1,632 || 64–66
|- style="background:#fbb"
| 131 || September 4 || @ Giants || 3–4 || Mark Davis (5–8) || Freddie Toliver (0–1) || None || 2,067 || 64–67
|- style="background:#fbb"
| 132 || September 6 || @ Padres || 2–3 (11) || Rich Gossage (3–2) || Dave Shipanoff (1–1) || None || 14,889 || 64–68
|- style="background:#bfb"
| 133 || September 7 || @ Padres || 2–0 || John Denny (10–11) || Andy Hawkins (17–5) || None || 11,141 || 65–68
|- style="background:#bfb"
| 134 || September 8 || @ Padres || 9–7 || Rich Surhoff (1–0) || Ed Wojna (1–3) || Dave Rucker (1) || 15,765 || 66–68
|- style="background:#bfb"
| 135 || September 10 || Expos || 5–2 (11) || Don Carman (8–4) || Tim Burke (8–3) || None || 15,920 || 67–68
|- style="background:#bfb"
| 136 || September 11 || Expos || 4–1 || Kevin Gross (14–9) || Bill Gullickson (13–11) || None || 15,193 || 68–68
|- style="background:#fbb"
| 137 || September 12 || Expos || 3–6 || Floyd Youmans (3–2) || Shane Rawley (11–7) || Jeff Reardon (34) || 15,335 || 68–69
|- style="background:#bfb"
| 138 || September 13 || @ Pirates || 6–3 || John Denny (11–11) || Bob Walk (1–3) || Kent Tekulve (14) || 4,429 || 69–69
|- style="background:#fbb"
| 139 || September 14 || @ Pirates || 3–6 || Lee Tunnell (4–9) || Steve Carlton (1–8) || Cecilio Guante (4) || 5,549 || 69–70
|- style="background:#fbb"
| 140 || September 15 || @ Pirates || 4–5 || Rick Reuschel (13–7) || Dave Shipanoff (1–2) || None || 5,961 || 69–71
|- style="background:#fbb"
| 141 || September 16 || @ Mets || 0–9 || Dwight Gooden (21–4) || Kevin Gross (14–10) || None || 30,606 || 69–72
|- style="background:#bfb"
| 142 || September 17 || @ Mets || 5–1 || Shane Rawley (12–7) || Ed Lynch (10–8) || None || 22,440 || 70–72
|- style="background:#fbb"
| 143 || September 18 || Cardinals || 0–7 || Bob Forsch (8–6) || John Denny (11–12) || None || 17,354 || 70–73
|- style="background:#bfb"
| 144 || September 19 || Cardinals || 6–3 || Dave Rucker (3–1) || Matt Keough (0–1) || Don Carman (6) || 17,120 || 71–73
|- style="background:#fbb"
| 145 || September 20 || Cubs || 1–3 || Reggie Patterson (1–0) || Charles Hudson (7–12) || Lee Smith (30) || 20,207 || 71–74
|- style="background:#fbb"
| 146 || September 21 || Cubs || 2–9 || Johnny Abrego (1–0) || Kevin Gross (14–11) || None || 17,779 || 71–75
|- style="background:#fbb"
| 147 || September 22 || Cubs || 2–9 || Dennis Eckersley (10–6) || Shane Rawley (12–8) || None || 21,768 || 71–76
|- style="background:#fbb"
| 148 || September 23 || Mets || 1–4 || Rick Aguilera (9–6) || Freddie Toliver (0–2) || Roger McDowell (16) || 15,295 || 71–77
|- style="background:#fbb"
| 149 || September 24 || Mets || 1–7 || Sid Fernandez (8–9) || Dave Rucker (3–2) || None || 14,398 || 71–78
|- style="background:#fbb"
| 150 || September 25 || @ Cardinals || 3–6 || Danny Cox (17–9) || Charles Hudson (7–13) || Jeff Lahti (18) || 17,733 || 71–79
|- style="background:#fbb"
| 151 || September 26 || @ Cardinals || 0–5 || John Tudor (20–8) || Kevin Gross (14–12) || None || 23,598 || 71–80
|- style="background:#fbb"
| 152 || September 27 || @ Cubs || 7–9 || Jay Baller (2–3) || Kent Tekulve (4–10) || Lee Smith (31) || 9,258 || 71–81
|- style="background:#fbb"
| 153 || September 28 || @ Cubs || 10–11 || Dennis Eckersley (11–6) || John Denny (11–13) || Lee Smith (32) || 27,875 || 71–82
|- style="background:#fbb"
| 154 || September 29 || @ Cubs || 2–6 || Steve Trout (9–6) || Freddie Toliver (0–3) || None || 26,641 || 71–83
|-

|- style="background:#bbb"
| – || October 1 || @ Expos || colspan=6 | Postponed (rain); Makeup: October 2 as a traditional double-header
|- style="background:#fbb"
| 155 || October 2 (1) || @ Expos || 1–3 || Bryn Smith (18–5) || Kevin Gross (14–13) || Jeff Reardon (39) || see 2nd game || 71–84
|- style="background:#bfb"
| 156 || October 2 (2) || @ Expos || 3–2 || Charles Hudson (8–13) || David Palmer (7–10) || None || 10,178 || 72–84
|- style="background:#bfb"
| 157 || October 3 || @ Expos || 8–7 || Shane Rawley (13–8) || Bill Laskey (5–16) || Don Carman (7) || 7,772 || 73–84
|- style="background:#fbb"
| 158 || October 4 (1) || Pirates || 2–7 || Bob Walk (2–3) || John Denny (11–14) || José DeLeón (3) || see 2nd game || 73–85
|- style="background:#bfb"
| 159 || October 4 (2) || Pirates || 8–5 || Don Carman (9–4) || José DeLeón (2–19) || None || 12,410 || 74–85
|- style="background:#fbb"
| 160 || October 5 (1) || Pirates || 2–4 || Larry McWilliams (7–9) || Freddie Toliver (0–4) || Rick Reuschel (1) || see 2nd game || 74–86
|- style="background:#fbb"
| 161 || October 5 (2) || Pirates || 0–5 || Mike Bielecki (2–3) || Rocky Childress (0–1) || None || 21,820 || 74–87
|- style="background:#bfb"
| 162 || October 6 || Pirates || 5–0 || Kevin Gross' (15–13) || Rick Rhoden (10–15) || None || 13,749 || 75–87
|-

Roster

 Player stats 

 Batting 

 Starters by position Note: Pos = Position; G = Games played; AB = At bats; H = Hits; Avg. = Batting average; HR = Home runs; RBI = Runs batted in Other batters Note: G = Games played; AB = At bats; H = Hits; Avg. = Batting average; HR = Home runs; RBI = Runs batted in Pitching 

 Starting pitchers Note: G = Games pitched; IP = Innings pitched; W = Wins; L = Losses; ERA = Earned run average; SO = Strikeouts Other pitchers Note: G = Games pitched; IP = Innings pitched; W = Wins; L = Losses; ERA = Earned run average; SO = Strikeouts Relief pitchers Note: G = Games pitched; W = Wins; L = Losses; SV = Saves; ERA = Earned run average; SO = Strikeouts''

Farm system

References

1985 Philadelphia Phillies season at Baseball Reference
 1985 Philadelphia Phillies team page at www.baseball-almanac.com

Philadelphia Phillies seasons
Philadelphia Phillies season
Philadelphia